Tine De Caigny (born 9 June 1997) is a Belgian footballer who plays for Frauen-Bundesliga club 1899 Hoffenheim and the Belgium national team.

Career 
On 12 November 2019, De Caigny became the first Belgian player to score five goals in a senior international game, 6–0 against Lithuania. On 18 July 2022, she scored the only goal in a 1–0 win over Italy, in which she helped her country to reach the quarter-finals of the Euro 2022 for the first time in the history of the competition.

Career statistics
Scores and results list Belgium's goal tally first, score column indicates score after each De Caigny goal.

Honours 
Anderlecht
 Super League: 2017–18, 2018–19, 2019–20; runner-up 2016–17

Lierse
 Belgian Women's Cup: 2015–16

Club Brugge
 Belgian Women's Cup runner-up: 2013–14, 2014–15

References

External links 
 
 

1997 births
Living people
Belgian women's footballers
Belgian expatriate sportspeople in Germany
Belgium women's international footballers
Expatriate women's footballers in Germany
Women's association football defenders
TSG 1899 Hoffenheim (women) players
RSC Anderlecht (women) players
Super League Vrouwenvoetbal players
Club Brugge KV (women) players
Lierse SK (women) players
Belgium LGBT sportspeople
Belgian lesbians
LGBT association football players
Lesbian sportswomen
People from Beveren
Footballers from East Flanders
UEFA Women's Euro 2022 players
UEFA Women's Euro 2017 players